Big Pats Creek is a bounded rural locality in Victoria, Australia to the south of Woods Point Road beyond Warburton, located within the Shire of Yarra Ranges local government area. Big Pats Creek recorded a population of 60 at the 2021 census.

History
Big Pats Creek Post Office opened on 21 November 1913 and closed in 1965.

References

Towns in Victoria (Australia)
Yarra Valley
Yarra Ranges